Psychedelic Sexfunk Live from Heaven is a video album filmed in concert at Long Beach Arena, California on December 30, 1989 and released in 1990 on VHS. The video contains live, rehearsal and backstage footage of the Red Hot Chili Peppers with the lineup of Anthony Kiedis, Flea, Chad Smith, and John Frusciante during the Mother's Milk tour. The video has never been released on DVD and has long been out of print.

Track listing
"Stone Cold Bush"
"Flea's Star Spangled Banner"
"Good Time Boys"
"Sexy Mexican Maid"
"Magic Johnson"
"Pretty Little Ditty"
"Knock Me Down"
"Boyz-n-the-Hood"/"Special Secret Song Inside"
"Subway To Venus"
"Nevermind"

Personnel
Flea – bass, trumpet, backing vocals
John Frusciante – guitar, backing vocals
Anthony Kiedis – lead vocals
Chad Smith – drums

Additional musicians
Keith "Tree" Barry - saxophone, backing vocals

References

Red Hot Chili Peppers video albums